Old Town Bridge may refer to:

Norway
 Old Town Bridge, Trondheim

United States
Old Town Bridge (Wayland, Massachusetts), listed on the National Register of Historic Places in Middlesex County, Massachusetts
 Old Town Bridge (Franklin, Tennessee), listed on the National Register of Historic Places in Williamson County, Tennessee, and part of the Old Town (Franklin, Tennessee) complex of historic sites